Elma Ngatokoa Maua (12 November 1948 – 28 April 2010) was a Cook Islands-born New Zealand journalist and editor. Maua was one of New Zealand's first Pacific Islander journalists.

Maua was born in Rarotonga, Cook Islands in 1948, the youngest of six children.  She moved with her family to Wellington, New Zealand, in 1952.

She worked as a journalist for Radio New Zealand and Niu FM. In 1999, Maua briefly returned to the Cook Islands, where she worked in the Prime Minister's office.

In 2010, her deteriorating health forced Maua to retire as the sports editor of Radio New Zealand International. She died on 28 April 2010, in Wellington, New Zealand, at the age of 61. She was survived by her five children.

References

External links
Elma Maua obituary

1948 births
2010 deaths
New Zealand journalists
New Zealand radio journalists
New Zealand women radio journalists
New Zealand editors
New Zealand women journalists
New Zealand women editors
Cook Island journalists
Cook Island emigrants to New Zealand
People from Rarotonga
People from Wellington City